Youth (French: Jeunesse) is a 1934 French drama film directed by Georges Lacombe and starring Robert Arnoux, Lisette Lanvin and Jean Servais.

The film's sets were designed by Pierre Schild.

Cast
 Robert Arnoux as Jean  
 Lisette Lanvin as Marie  
 Jean Servais as Pierre  
 Jean-Louis Allibert as Louis  
 Paulette Dubost as Gisèle 
 Charles Camus as Le père  
 Franck Maurice as Le cafetier  
 Jane Pierson as La cliente  
 Made Siamé as L'infirmière  
 Eugène Stuber as Le patron  
 Titys as L'ivrogne

References

Bibliography 
 Aitken, Ian. The Concise Routledge Encyclopedia of the Documentary Film. Routledge, 2013.

External links 
 

1934 films
1934 drama films
French drama films
1930s French-language films
Films directed by Georges Lacombe
French black-and-white films
Films set in Paris
1930s French films